The practice and study of medicine in Persia has a long and prolific history. The Iranian academic centers like Gundeshapur University (3rd century AD) were a breeding ground for the union among great scientists from different civilizations. These centers successfully followed their predecessors’ theories and greatly extended their scientific research through history. Persians were the first establishers of modern hospital system.

In recent years, some experimental studies have indeed evaluated medieval Iranian medical remedies using modern scientific methods. These studies raised the possibility of revival of traditional treatments on the basis of evidence-based medicine.

History and background

Pre-Islamic 

The medical history of ancient Persia can be divided into three distinct periods. The sixth book of Zend-Avesta contains some of the earliest records of the history of ancient Iranian medicine. The Vendidad in fact devotes most of the last chapters to medicine.

The Vendidad, one of the surviving texts of the Zend-Avesta, distinguishes three kinds of medicine: medicine by the knife (surgery), medicine by herbs, and medicine by divine words; and the best medicine was, according to the Vendidad, healing by divine words:

Although the Avesta mentions several notable physicians, the most notable—Mani, Roozbeh, and Bozorgmehr—were to emerge later.

The second epoch covers the era of what is known as Pahlavi literature, where the entire subject of medicine was systematically treated in an interesting tractate incorporated in the encyclopedic work of Dinkart, which listed in altered form some 4333 diseases.

The third era begins with the Achaemenid dynasty, and covers the period of Darius I of Persia, whose interest in medicine was said to be so great that he re-established the school of medicine in Sais, Egypt, which previously had been destroyed, restoring its books and equipment.

The first teaching hospital was the Academy of Gundishapur in the Persian Empire. Some experts go so far as to claim that, "to a very large extent, the credit for the whole hospital system must be given to Persia".

According to the Vendidad, physicians, to prove proficiency, had to cure three patients of the followers of Divyasnan; if they failed, they could not practice medicine.  At first glance, this recommendation may appear discriminant and based on human experimentation.  But some authors have construed this to mean that, from the beginning, physicians were taught to remove the mental barrier and to treat adversaries as well as friends. The physician’s fee for service was based on the patient’s income.

The practice of ancient Iranian medicine was interrupted by the Arab invasion (630 A.D.). However, the advances of the Sassanid period were continued and expanded upon during the flourishing of Islamicate sciences at Baghdad, with the Arabic text Tārīkh al-ḥukamā crediting the Academy of Gondishapur for establishing licensure of physicians and proper medical treatment and training. Many Pahlavi scripts were translated into Arabic, and the region of Greater Iran produced physicians and scientists such as Abū ʿAlī al-Ḥusayn ibn ʿAbd Allāh ibn Sīnā and Muhammad ibn Zakariya al-Razi as well as mathematicians such as Kharazmi and Omar Khayyám. They collected and systematically expanded the Greek, Indian, and Persian ancient medical heritage and made further discoveries.

Medieval Islamic Period 

One of the main roles played by medieval Iranian scholars in the scientific field was the conservation, consolidation, coordination, and development of ideas and knowledge in ancient civilizations. Some Iranian Hakim (practitioners) such as
Muhammad ibn Zakariya ar-Razi, known to the West as Rhazes, and Ibn Sina, better known as Avicenna, were not only responsible for accumulating all the existing information on medicine of the time, but adding to this knowledge by their own astute observations, experimentation and skills. "Qanoon fel teb of Avicenna" ("The Canon") and "Kitab al-Hawi of Razi" ("Continens") were among the central texts in Western medical education from the 13th to the 18th centuries.

In the 14th century, the Persian language medical work Tashrih al-badan (Anatomy of the body), by Mansur ibn Ilyas (c. 1390), contained comprehensive diagrams of the body's structural, nervous and circulatory systems.

Cranial surgery and mental health 

Evidence of surgery dates to the 3rd century BC when the first cranial surgery was performed in the Shahr-e-Sukhteh (Burnt City) in south-eastern Iran. The archaeological studies on the skull of a 13-year-old girl suffering from hydrocephaly indicated that she had undergone cranial surgery to take a part of her skull bone and the girl lived for at least 6 months after the surgery.

Several documents still exist from which the definitions and treatments of a headache in medieval Persia can be ascertained. These documents give detailed and precise clinical information on the different types of headaches. The medieval physicians listed various signs and symptoms, apparent causes, and hygienic and dietary rules for prevention of headaches. The medieval writings are both accurate and vivid, and they provide long lists of substances used in the treatment of headaches. Many of the approaches of physicians in medieval Persia are accepted today; however, still more of them could be of use to modern medicine.
An antiepileptic drug-therapy plan in medieval Iranian medicine is individualized, given different single and combined drug-therapy with a dosing schedule for each of those. Physicians stress the importance of dose, and route of administration and define a schedule for drug administration. Recent animal experiments confirm the anticonvulsant potency of some of the compounds which are recommended by Medieval Iranian practitioners in epilepsy treatment.

In The Canon of Medicine (c. 1025), Avicenna described numerous mental conditions, including hallucination, insomnia, mania, nightmare, melancholia, dementia, epilepsy, paralysis, stroke, vertigo and tremor.

Obstetrics and gynecology 

In the 10th century work of Shahnama, Ferdowsi describes a Caesarean section performed on Rudaba, during which a special wine agent was prepared by a Zoroastrian priest and used as an anesthetic to produce unconsciousness for the operation. Although largely mythical in content, the passage illustrates working knowledge of anesthesia in ancient Persia.

See also 
 Irani traditional medicine
 Science in Iran
 Islamic medicine
 Unani

References

External links 
 Iranchamber.com: Medical Sciences in Avesta

Iran
Traditional Iranian Medicine
Medicine01
M01
Medicine01
Traditional medicine
Medicine
Medieval history of Iran